Amum-Her-Khepesh-Ef ("Amun Is with His Strong Arm") (died ca. 1883 BC) was the supposed son of Pharaoh Sen Woset III and Queen Hathor-Hotpe .

He died at the age of two and was interred in Egypt, likely Dahshur. His mummy was stolen by graverobbers and purchased by Henry Sheldon from some visiting Spanish sailors in New York in 1886 for display in his museum. However, the mummy arrived in such poor condition that it was relegated to the attic. After his death, it remained there until 1945, when a curator named George Mead came across it. Fearing that the mummy might be dug up by student pranksters if buried whole, he had it cremated in his neighbor's furnace in 1950 and interred in his family plot, with a suitable headstone. His grave is next that of General Hastings Warren and near that of Vermont Representative Daniel Chipman

References

External links
 
 Grave of the Mummy at roadsideamerica.com
 

18th-century BC deaths
18th-century BC births
Princes of the Twelfth Dynasty of Egypt
Royalty who died as children